Kasenengwa is a constituency of the National Assembly of Zambia. It covers Kasenengwa District in Eastern Province.

List of MPs

References

Constituencies of the National Assembly of Zambia
1983 establishments in Zambia
Constituencies established in 1983